Pearls Daily (born Brianna Hurley) is an American actress, dancer, burlesque artist, filmmaker, and model. She has credits in theatre, film, television, and commercials.

Career 
Daily began her career under the name Brianna Hurley, and made one of her earliest professional appearances as part of the Disney Cruise Line, in the role of Snow White with The Golden Mickeys. She was a member of the 20th cast on Disney Magic from 2006 to 2007. This was Daily's professional debut, having studied at the American Musical and Dramatics Academy 2005–06, as part of the Integrated Musical Theater Program. Her past education also includes classes at the New England Ballet Company, The New York School of Burlesque, The Pearl Theatre Company, and studies in acting, sketch comedy, and Spolin technique with such instructors as Hal Peller, Gary Austin, Jacqueline and Kerry Donelli, and Conn Horgan.

Following a run with Teatro Jacó in Costa Rica, Daily made a move from Ensemble to a leading role of Mina "Margery" Crandon in the Teller-directed Todd Robbins production Play Dead. She played the role as part of the cast of the Geffen Playhouse production of the show.

Daily has a number of credits in reimagined stagings of Shakespeare plays with TP&co, including: Much Ado About Nothing, Macbeth, A Midsummer Night's Dream, The Taming of the Shrew, and The Two Gentlemen of Verona.

In 2015, Brianna Hurley officially began performing as Pearls Daily, the name by which she is best known, though she still receives occasional credits as Hurley.

Daily has been on the Production Team of the New York Burlesque Festival as Volunteer Coordinator since 2016, in addition to performing as part of the event. She is a member of Perle Noire's House of Noire, which won "Best Large Group" at The Burlesque Hall of Fame in 2017. The same year, she also performed in Filthy Gorgeous Burlesque with the dance company, an event highlighted in Time Out magazine. Also in 2017, Daily made an appearance on the award-winning television series The Marvelous Mrs. Maisel, in the role of Maxine. In line with her burlesque career, Daily was crowned Miss Coney Island in 2019. As Miss Coney Island 2019, Daily was also featured in the 37th Annual Mermaid Parade on Coney Island, and appeared on Manhattan Neighborhood Network for an hour-long interview entitled "Imagining Pearls of Burlesque" on The Radical Imagination. That same year, she had a featured role in I’m Not a Comedian…I’m Lenny Bruce, directed by Joe Mantegna.

Daily played the title role in Minky Woodcock: The Girl Who Handcuffed Houdini, an immersive theater production which brought the comics of Cynthia von Buhler to life. Buhler's character of Minky was visually modeled after Daily. Though most of the graphic novel is illustrated, Daily was featured on Cover No. 4 of the first Minky Woodcock comic, and she is the only individual to have portrayed a live-action depiction of the character. Daily was interviewed alongside Buhler and Hard Case Crime founder Charles Ardai at New York Comic Con in 2018.

The success of the first release resulted in a second publication of the series, Minky Woodcock: The Girl Who Electrified Tesla, which also featured Daily on the photographic cover. Daily previously worked with Buhler in the interactive Speakeasy Dollhouse show, Ziegfeld's Midnight Frolic.

Daily was in the cast of the 2020 Hey, It's Me, an Emmy-nominated sci-fi short film which is currently streaming on Dust.

Daily has played various characters in films since 2008, but ventured behind the camera to supplement her role in front of it as the Director and Producer of Briar, a horror/thriller film surrounding the character of Briar Hughes, a filmmaker with serial killer tendencies played by Daily herself. Her husband, cinematographer Arthur Woo, handled the lighting, camera, and coloring for the film. Briar was presented as part of the Awesome Con Short Film Festival in 2021 by Astray Productions. Briar was selected to appear at international film festivals, including The French Riviera Film Festival and the Coney Island Film Festival, and won awards for "Best Thriller", "Best Experimental Film", "Best Actress" and "Best Cinematography". Daily continues her work as a producer, most recently with the release of the film Layers in 2022.

Of her acting persona, Daily has said "I am here to change your mind about the girl next door. Inspired by the great actors of the silver screen, I am here to create characters that are not afraid to get dirty, play dirty and have impact. I am the unexpected leading lady".

Other on-screen appearances include commercials for Pepsi, Olay, Canon, Bergdorf Goodman, and Nat Nast, in addition to modeling spots in such publications as Moped Magazine, The Rev Magazine, Titan Comics, and EM Magazine.

Credits

Theatre

Film

Television

References

External links 
 Official Website
 

American filmmakers
21st-century American actresses
21st-century American dancers
American female models
Year of birth missing (living people)
Living people
Place of birth missing (living people)